Biagio d’Antonio Tucci (1446 – 1 June 1516) was an Italian Renaissance painter active in Florence, Faenza and Rome.

Biography
Biagio was born in Florence. It is not known with whom he trained, but his early style reflects the influence of Filippo Lippi, Andrea del Verrocchio and Domenico Ghirlandaio. The latter two were also Biagio's collaborators. With the former Biagio painted the Madonna and Child with Saints for the church of San Domenico del Maglio, now in the Museum of Fine Arts, Budapest. By 1472 he was in a partnership with Jacopo del Sellaio, with whom he painted two great chests, the Morelli Nerli Cassoni (London, Courtauld Institute). Like Sellaio, Biagio was prolific in the art of cassone painting for the duration of his career.

By 1476 Biagio was simultaneously operating workshops in Florence and Faenza. The first work he painted for Faenza was the Ragnoli Altarpiece for the church of San Michele. The central panel of this picture, depicting the Nativity with Saints and the Ragnoli Family as Donors, is now in the Kress Collection at the Philbrook Museum of Art, Tulsa, Oklahoma. The lunette, depicting Saint Michael Liberating Souls, is at the Musée du Petit Palais, Avignon.

Biagio's style continued to reflect Florentine innovations. His paintings also demonstrate influences—particularly in the decorative elements—from early Netherlandish painting.

In 1481–82 he assisted Cosimo Rosselli on frescoes in the Sistine Chapel, including the Last Supper and probably the Crossing of the Red Sea. In 1484 he was contracted to helped Pietro Perugino with some frescoes in the Palazzo della Signoria, Florence, which were never executed. In 1487 he collaborated with Bartolomeo di Giovanni, Pietro del Donzello and Domenico Ghirlandaio on a set of panels (a tondo by Ghirlandaio and three wainscot panels by the others) for the wedding chamber of Lorenzo Tornabuoni and Giovanna degli Albizzi. Biagio's panel from this cycle, depicting the Betrothal of Jason and Medea, is now at the Musée des Arts Décoratifs, Paris.

Later works by Biagio d'Antonio include the Madonna and Child with Saints Francis and Mary Magdalene for San Pancrazio, Florence (now at San Francesco in San Casciano in Val di Pesa; the predella of this work is at the Accademia Etrusca, Cortona) and a number of altarpieces for churches in Faenza, now in that city's picture gallery. Among these, the most important is the Madonna and Child with Saints John the Evangelist and Anthony of Padua for the Bazzolini chapel in San Francesco, completed in 1502.

Biagio died in Florence in 1516.

Selected works
 Madonna and Child, Angels and Saints Dominic, Andrew, John the Evangelist and Thomas Aquinas. Pinacoteca Comunale, Faenza.
 Madonna and Child, Two Angels and Saints John the Evangelist and Anthony of Padua. Pinacoteca Comunale, Faenza.
 St. Peter. Pinacoteca Comunale, Faenza.
Annunciation. Pinacoteca Comunale, Faenza.
 Portrait of a Young Man, c. 1470. Metropolitan Museum of Art, New York.
 The Triumph of Camillus, c. 1470/1475. National Gallery of Art, Washington, D.C.
 Madonna Worshipping the Child and an Angel, c. 1475. São Paulo Museum of Art, São Paulo.
 Portrait of a Boy, c. 1476–1480. National Gallery of Art, Washington, D.C.
 Madonna and Child with Saint John the Baptist, Musée des Beaux-Arts de Lyon
 Virgin and Child with St John the Baptist, St Peter and Two Musician Angels, c. 1465 Museum voor Schone Kunsten, Ghent

Sources

Bartoli, Roberta. Biagio d'Antonio. Milan: Electa, 1999.

External links

Italian Paintings: Florentine School, a collection catalog containing information about d'Antonio and his works (see pages: 142-148).

Italian Renaissance painters
1446 births
1516 deaths
Painters from Florence

15th-century Italian painters
Italian male painters
16th-century Italian painters